Reinsurance Group of America, Incorporated (NYSE: RGA) is a holding company for a global life and health reinsurance entity based in Greater St. Louis within the western suburb of Chesterfield, Missouri, United States. With approximately $3.5 trillion of life reinsurance in force and assets of $92.2 billion as of December 31, 2021, RGA has grown to become the only international company to focus primarily on life and health-related reinsurance.

History

General American Reinsurance, a reinsurance division formed in 1973 by General American Life Insurance Company (GA), was the forerunner to RGA. By 1993, GA’s reinsurance division had grown its life reinsurance in force to $114.7 billion. General American acquired the life reinsurance business of National Reinsurance of Canada, later renamed General American Life Reinsurance Company of Canada, thereby establishing its first international office; the Canadian business became RGA Life Reinsurance Company of Canada after RGA's initial public offering (IPO).

Incorporated in 1992 in the state of Missouri, Reinsurance Group of America, Incorporated (RGA) was formed as a holding company for GA’s U.S. and Canadian reinsurance businesses. RGA was taken public by IPO in 1993 on the New York Stock Exchange (NYSE: RGA), with General American retaining a 65% share.

MetLife acquired General American in 2000, including its interest in RGA, and after 8 years of ownership, MetLife spun RGA off to become a fully independent company.

Awards 
Ranked 222 on the 2022 Fortune 500 list, RGA was also named to Forbes “America’s 50 Most Trustworthy Financial Companies” 2014 list and the Forbes Global 2000: Best Regarded Companies list. In 2017, RGA was ranked #1 on NMG Consulting’s Global All Respondent Business Capability Index (BCI), based on feedback from insurance executives in more than 50 markets.

Products and services

RGA’s business includes life reinsurance, living benefits reinsurance, group reinsurance, health reinsurance, financial solutions and facultative underwriting. RGA also sells bancassurance and retakaful, and offers product development, risk management, electronic underwriting and client training services.

References

External links

Companies listed on the New York Stock Exchange
Companies based in Chesterfield, Missouri
Insurance companies of the United States
Reinsurance companies
Financial services companies established in 1973
1973 establishments in Missouri